The 2010 South American Under-17 Women's Championship was the second instance of the South American Under-17 Women's Championship. It was held from 28 January to 11 February in São Paulo, Brazil. As the top 3 teams, Brazil, Chile, and Venezuela qualified for the 2010 FIFA U-17 Women's World Cup held in Trinidad and Tobago.

Group stage

Group A

Group B

Knockout stage
The winners of the two semifinal matches will qualify directly to the 2010 FIFA U-17 Women's World Cup held in Trinidad and Tobago. The losers of the semifinal matches will contest in a third-place match to determine who receives the last qualifying spot for the 2010 World Cup.

Semi-finals

Third place match

Final

External links
Official site

2010
CON
International women's association football competitions hosted by Brazil
Women
South
2010 in youth association football